Abdulwahab Al Safi (born 4 June 1984 in Manama, Bahrain) is Bahraini footballer. He is playing for Al-Muharraq in the Saudi Professional League. He plays as a midfielder. He was called up to the Bahrain national football team at 2011, 2015 AFC Asian Cup and 2019 Asian Cup.

International goals
Scores and results list Bahrain's goal tally first.

Financial contract
Abdulwahab's agent is Omar Al-Khalifa. His contract worths 96,000BHD (254,000$) and linked to a professional contract with Al-Muharraq Club to receive 1,800BHD (approx. 4,761$) monthly.

References

External links 
 

1984 births
Living people
Bahraini footballers
Bahrain international footballers
Association football midfielders
2011 AFC Asian Cup players
2015 AFC Asian Cup players
2019 AFC Asian Cup players
Al-Qadsiah FC players
Footballers at the 2010 Asian Games
Sportspeople from Manama
Saudi Professional League players
Asian Games competitors for Bahrain
Bahraini expatriate sportspeople in Saudi Arabia
Expatriate footballers in Saudi Arabia
Al-Muharraq SC players
Bahraini Premier League players